Candelaria de la Frontera is a municipality in the Santa Ana department of El Salvador.

References

Municipalities of the Santa Ana Department